Little Sodbury is an English village in South Gloucestershire, located between Chipping Sodbury, to the West, Old Sodbury to the South, Badminton, and the A46 road to the East and Horton and Hawkesbury Upton, to the north.

The "manor of Sodbury" comprises the nearby Chipping Sodbury and Old Sodbury: it is distinct from that of Little Sodbury.

Little Sodbury is one of three Thankful Villages in Gloucestershire – those rare places that suffered no fatalities during the Great War of 1914 to 1918.

The 15th century  Little Sodbury Manor was the home of Sir John Walsh who employed William Tyndale as chaplain and tutor to his grandchildren in 1522–3; by tradition he began his translation of the Bible in his bedroom here. The manor retains the porch and Great Hall, with a timber roof resting on corbels carved as shield-bearing angels,  of the fifteenth-century courtyard house. The house fell into disrepair in the nineteenth century, but was restored by architect Sir Harold Brakspear for Lord Grosvenor and later Baron de Tuyll.

St Adeline's Church was built in 1859 by William James.

References

 David Verey, Gloucestershire: the Cotswolds, The Buildings of England edited by Nikolaus Pevsner, 2nd ed. (1979) , pp. 303–304
 Anthony Emery, "Greater Medieval Houses of England and Wales, 1300-1500: Southern England", Cambridge University Press, 2006, p. 115

External links

 Sodbury Players - local amateur dramatics group in the Yate and Chipping Sodbury Area
 GENUKI - Little Sodbury
 The Modern Antiquarian: Little Sodbury Hillfort

Villages in South Gloucestershire District
Hill forts in Gloucestershire
Civil parishes in Gloucestershire